Rishat Mansurov (born 30 June 1969) is a Kazakhstani weightlifter. He competed in the men's light heavyweight event at the 1996 Summer Olympics.

References

External links
 

1969 births
Living people
Kazakhstani male weightlifters
Olympic weightlifters of Kazakhstan
Weightlifters at the 1996 Summer Olympics
Place of birth missing (living people)